Knill is a surname of Manx origin and is the equivalent of McNeill, MacNeill or Neill (Mac Néill in Irish; Mac Nèill in Scottish) in Ireland and Scotland. It is derived from the Manx for "son of Neill" and is an alternative to the more common Anglicisation of Kneale. In some cases the surname Knill is of English origin; in this case its meaning is "someone who lived on a hillock".

Alan Knill, footballer
Emanuel Knill, American physicist
Hansrüedi Knill (born 1940), Swiss middle-distance runner
John Knill (1733–1811), mayor of St Ives, Cornwall
John Knill (MP) (by 1519 – 1561 or 1564), English Member of Parliament.
J. Knill, English cricketer
Paolo Knill, Swiss scientist
Richard Knill, English missionary
Sir Stuart Knill, 1st Baronet (1824–1898), businessman and Lord Mayor of London

See also
Knill Baronets

References